Rafferty is an American drama series starring Patrick McGoohan that aired on CBS from September 28 until November 28, 1977. McGoohan played a former army doctor named Sid Rafferty who has retired and moved into private practice. One reviewer considers this series a forerunner to House, M.D.

It only lasted one season for 10 out of 13 episodes, and McGoohan was apparently very unhappy with the series, reportedly saying: "...a disaster ... the most miserable job I've ever done in my life ... a total frustration from start to finish.."

Cast
Patrick McGoohan as Dr. Sid Rafferty

Episodes

References

External links
 
 Opening & Sponsorship Sequence for Rafferty at The Museum of Classic Chicago Television (www.FuzzyMemories.TV)
 Summary of the Show from TV.com

1970s American medical television series
1977 American television series debuts
1977 American television series endings
CBS original programming
English-language television shows
Television series by Warner Bros. Television Studios
Television shows set in Los Angeles